Enoplochiton niger is a Southeast Pacific species of chiton, a marine polyplacophoran mollusc in the family Chitonidae, the typical chitons. It is the only species in the genus Enoplochiton.

Description
It is brown in color. Unlike the similar-sized Acanthopleura echinata of the same region, Enoplochiton niger lacks large spines.

Distribution, habitat and behavior
The distribution of Enoplochiton niger ranges along the Pacific coast of South America from Coquimbo in Chile to Talara in Peru. It inhabits the intertidal zone, and it is omnivorous.

References

Chitonidae
Chiton genera
Monotypic mollusc genera
Western South American coastal fauna
Molluscs of South America
Molluscs described in 1824